Mysore–Thoothukudi  Express is a daily train service between the cities of Mysore and Thoothukudi operated by the South Western Railway.

Introduction 
This train connects the Palace City Mysuru in Karnataka with the Pearl City, Thoothukudi in Tamil Nadu. The train initially operated from Madurai to Bengaluru before being extended to Tuticorin, after that it extended from Bengaluru to Mysuru.  Then the train belonged to the Southern Railway and hence is numbered as 16731/16732. Now it's renumbered to 16235/16236 so now it's operated by South Western Railway. It's one of the highly patronized trains of Mysuru division in South Western Railway.

Coach Composition

Rakes Sharing
Tiruchirappalli-Mayiladuthurai Express & Mysore-Mayiladuthurai Express

References

External links
Indiarailinfo

Transport in Mysore
Transport in Thoothukudi
Rail transport in Karnataka
Rail transport in Tamil Nadu